Merlyn (Arthur King), otherwise known as the Dark Archer, is a supervillain appearing in comic books published by DC Comics. He is a deadly bow-wielding assassin and contract killer and the archnemesis of Green Arrow, though writers have developed him over the years as an adversary of other superheroes as well, such as Batman and Black Canary.

Malcolm Merlyn appears in The CW's Arrowverse, portrayed by John Barrowman.

Publication history
Created by Mike Friedrich, Neal Adams, and Dick Dillin, Merlyn made his debut in Justice League of America #94 in November 1971.

Fictional character biography
Long before becoming the vigilante Green Arrow, Oliver Queen was inspired to take up archery after hearing of the exploits of Arthur King, otherwise known as "Merlyn the Magician", a master archer with acute accuracy. Years later, Merlyn challenged the Green Arrow to a public archery duel and defeated Oliver. With that victory under his belt, Merlyn vanished for years before resurfacing as a member of the League of Assassins. During his time with the League of Assassins, Merlyn took part in the highly abusive training of David Cain's daughter Cassandra Cain, unknowingly being behind the girl's skills as Batgirl. He and Green Arrow faced each other again when Merlyn attempted to assassinate Batman; Green Arrow managed to intercept Merlyn's arrow with one of his own, saving Batman's life. Merlyn admitted that Green Arrow had improved since their last encounter, but escaped before he could be captured.

In Action Comics, Merlyn, now working as a freelance assassin and contract killer who sells his skills to the highest bidder, is hired by Queen Bee (Zazzala) to join a supervillain team and take on the Justice League. He then serves under Tobias Whale as a member of Metropolis' crime syndicate the 100. Merlyn attempts to kill Black Lightning when he accompanies Joey Toledo. Though the League of Assassins crash the battle when they were displeased that Merlyn left them. He is ultimately defeated by Black Lightning while Toledo was killed during the three-way battle. A man from Libya later hires Meryln to kill a Russian scientist visiting Casablanca. Although Merlyn is aided by Syonide, his assassination attempt is foiled by the Flash and Phantom Lady.

During the events of "Underworld Unleashed," Merlyn is among the villains that sell their souls to the demon Neron in exchange for greater power. He then joins the Killer Elite (along with Deadshot, Monocle, Bolt, Chiller and Deadline) to perform various assassinations with Merlyn wanting to do his dream assassination on Batman, but the group is eventually stopped by the Justice League. The Killer Elite later encounters the Body Doubles, and Merlyn and his team are defeated.

In Young Justice, Merlyn is hired by the Zandian government to mentor the young archer Turk, a half-wolf metahuman. Merlyn and Turk attempt to sabotage an archery contest in their favor, but they are stopped by the Young Justice team.

Merlyn next appears as one of the primary villains in the Injustice Gang in the "Identity Crisis" miniseries. He warns and correctly predicts that the death of Sue Dibny would have troublesome and dire consequences in the criminal underworld. Although the Justice League manages to capture Merlyn, Monacle and Deadshot, the latter is able to use connections with the Suicide Squad and Amanda Waller to arrange for their release, much to the frustration of the newest Manhunter. Merlyn, Deadshot, Monacle and Phobia later attempt to kill the Shadow Thief during his trial, but are confronted and stopped by the Manhunter.

During the "Infinite Crisis" storyline, Merlyn serves as a member of Alexander Luthor Jr.'s Society. Since then, he has resumed his feud with Green Arrow, launching several attacks on the hero's family. Merlyn then plays a major role in the attack on Green Arrow and Black Canary's wedding as a member of the new Injustice League.

During Countdown, Merlyn appears under the employ of the League of Assassins, coordinating his attacks with Talia al Ghul and serving as a mentor to Damian Wayne. Merlyn has a minor role in The Resurrection of Ra's al Ghul, in which he is hired by the Sensei to take out a spring where Ra's al Ghul could revitalize himself. He is defeated during the final confrontation between Ra's and Batman. Merlyn then joins the League of Assassins' elite team known as the Seven Men of Death, and is sent to Gotham City to retrieve the Suit of Sorrows from the Order of Purity. During the attack on the Order, Merlyn kills the Order's leader Leland McCauley, and injures Felicidad Gomez before being confronted by Azrael. Merlyn and his team attempt to capture Azrael and move him to their headquarters, but Azrael uses one of Merlyn's own arrows to stab him.

Merlyn is later captured by the vigilante Cupid who plans to kill him in front of Green Arrow, with whom Cupid is besotted. To this end, she slashes Merlyn's throat with an arrow, and although Green Arrow is able to get Merlyn medical attention in time to save his life, the villain's vocal cords are severely damaged.

The New 52
In The New 52 reboot's Batman Incorporated, Merlyn appears under the League of Assassins' employ and serves as a member of the Seven Men of Death who are tasked by Talia al Ghul's Leviathan organization to destroy Batman Incorporated. Merlyn defeats members of the group with ease, until his bow is broken by a surprise shot from Damian Wayne. During the "Forever Evil" storyline, Merlyn is one of the numerous villains recruited by the Crime Syndicate of America to join the Secret Society of Super Villains.

DC Rebirth
In the DC Rebirth relaunch, the Green Arrow series reveals that Arthur King changed his name to Malcolm Merlyn (a concept incorporated from the Arrow television series). When he was around 25 years old, Malcolm joined the League of Assassins, an ancient, international order of the world's greatest killers, and was trained by their leader Ra's al Ghul himself. Malcolm's commencement ceremony into the organization involved him digging an eight-foot-long, six-foot-deep, and four-foot-wide grave, which he had to lie in to purge himself of his past life and emerge reborn. Now a deadly assassin known as the Dark Archer, Malcolm is contracted by Cyrus Broderick, a director of the Ninth Circle criminal organization, to frame the Green Arrow (Oliver Queen) for murder after he destroyed the Inferno, their base of operations that hosted their "bank" and resources. Using arrows resembling Green Arrow's for multiple high-profile killings, including the murder of famous soccer player Cy Sampson, the Dark Archer succeeds in tarnishing the hero's image and reputation. Green Arrow and the Dark Archer later engage in a fierce duel, with Oliver believing the hooded villain to be Malcolm's son, Tommy. Malcolm then reveals himself to Oliver as "the original Dark Archer", and proceeds to best his foe in combat whilst taunting him. Before Malcolm can kill Oliver, however, the intervention of Black Canary and the police forces the villain to flee. As he escapes, Merlyn fires an arrow at the police chief, whom Green Arrow narrowly manages to save at the cost of his own bow, which is shattered by Merlyn's shot.

In Batman, Merlyn was one of the assassins hired by the Penguin and the Designer to kill Batman. He was captured by the GCPD, but managed to escape. He, along with Cheshire, attempted to attack Catwoman and Harley Quinn at a cemetery, but both were defeated by them.

Powers and abilities
Merlyn (Arthur King) has been established as one of the greatest and most accurate archers in the DC Universe. His archery and marksmanship skills exceed those of Green Arrow, Emiko Queen, Shado, Roy Harper, Connor Hawke, Celestial Archer, and his own son, Tommy Merlyn. The Dark Archer has been known to use trick arrows to kill his targets, including explosive arrows that detonate upon impact. He is extremely proficient with swords, throwing knives, and various other weapons as well. Having been trained by the League of Assassins, Merlyn is at the prime of human physical and mental conditioning, possessing advanced strength, agility, and reflexes. He is a master in the art of stealth and has an incredibly high tolerance for pain, and his Kevlar body armor further enhances his durability. Merlyn is also a formidable expert in many forms of hand-to-hand combat and martial arts, being able to best the likes of Green Arrow with relative ease.

In other media

Television
 Merlyn makes non-speaking appearances in Justice League Unlimited as a member of Gorilla Grodd's Secret Society. Prior to and during the episode "Alive!", Lex Luthor takes command of the Society, but Grodd mounts a mutiny. Merlyn sides with the latter before he is frozen by Killer Frost and killed off-screen by Darkseid along with most of the Society.
 A character based on the Dark Archer named Vordigan appears in Smallville, portrayed by Steve Bacic. He is a member of the Brotherhood of Sion and mentor to Oliver Queen. After the latter leaves the Brotherhood, the former does the same to find Queen and help him fulfill his role as a "master archer". In the episode "Disciple", he attacks Lois Lane and Chloe Sullivan and kidnaps Mia Dearden to draw out Queen and make him kill his master. However, Queen refuses to kill Vordigan, instead focusing on saving Mia with Clark Kent's help. In the process, he wounds Vordigan, who is subsequently incarcerated. As of the episode "Prophecy", Vordigan has escaped from prison and joined Toyman's Marionette Ventures.

Arrowverse 

Malcolm Merlyn / Dark Archer appears in media set in the Arrowverse, portrayed by John Barrowman.
 Introduced and primarily appearing in the TV series Arrow, this version is the wealthy CEO of Merlyn Global Group bent on seeking revenge for his wife, who was murdered by Brick years prior in a crime-infested district of Starling City called the Glades. In pursuit of his quest, he abandoned his son Tommy Merlyn and trained with the League of Assassins in Nanda Parbat, where he became known as the "Magician" (Arabic: الساحر Al Sa-Her). Years later, Malcolm returned to Starling City to plot an "Undertaking" to destroy the Glades via an earthquake-generating device with help from Robert Queen. When Robert tried to back out, Malcolm arranged for Robert's yacht to be destroyed, which led to Robert's son Oliver getting stranded on Lian Yu for five years. In the first season, Oliver returns, becomes a vigilante called the "Hood", and interferes with Malcolm's plans before seemingly killing him in the season finale. While Malcolm's plan succeeds, Tommy is among the victims claimed in the Undertaking. In the second season, having faked his death, Malcolm convinces his daughter and Oliver's half-sister Thea Queen to join him and trains her in martial arts. In the third season, the League of Assassins hunt Malcolm for breaking their code with his Undertaking. While evading them, he brainwashes Thea into becoming a target by murdering Sara Lance and helps Oliver kill the League's leader Ra's al Ghul, allowing Malcolm to take over as the new Ra's al Ghul. In the fourth season, Merlyn resurrects Sara with the League's Lazarus Pit to appease Thea and Laurel Lance, only to face opposition from a League splinter faction led by Nyssa al Ghul. After Malcolm refuses to hand over leadership to her, Oliver ends the League's civil war by severing Malcolm's left hand in a duel, costing him the demon's head ring. Nonetheless, Malcolm adopts a cybernetic prosthetic and joins H.I.V.E. until they attempt to destroy the world with nuclear missiles, leading to Malcolm reluctantly defecting to Team Arrow to stop them. Towards the end of the fifth season, Malcolm aids Team Arrow in rescuing Thea after she is kidnapped by Prometheus, culminating in Malcolm sacrificing himself to save Thea from a landmine and Captain Boomerang, taking the latter with him in the process.
 Malcolm Merlyn appears in the crossovers "Heroes Join Forces", in which he helps Oliver and Barry Allen defeat Vandal Savage before collecting his ashes, and "Elseworlds", in which he appears as a police officer after John Deegan uses the Book of Destiny to rewrite reality.
 A dream world incarnation of Malcolm Merlyn named "Cutter" Moran appears in The Flash episode "Duet".
 A time-displaced Malcolm Merlyn appears in the second season of Legends of Tomorrow as a member of Eobard Thawne's Legion of Doom. He is recruited into the Legion to seek out the Spear of Destiny and rewrite reality to change their fates, only to be defeated the Legends and returned to their original places in time with no memory of their Legionnaire activities.

Film
 Merlyn appears the script for Green Arrow: Escape from Super Max as an inmate of the titular prison.
 Merlyn the Magnificent appears in DC Showcase: Green Arrow, voiced by Malcolm McDowell.

Video games
 Merlyn appears in as a non-player character (NPC) in Injustice: Gods Among Us via Green Arrow's S.T.A.R. Labs missions.
 The Arrowverse incarnation Malcolm Merlyn appears in Lego Batman 3: Beyond Gotham via the Arrow DLC.
 Malcolm Merlyn appears in Lego DC Super-Villains, voiced by John Barrowman. This version is a member of the Legion of Doom.

Miscellaneous
 The Arrowverse incarnation of Malcolm Merlyn appears in a flashback in the Arrow tie-in comic, The Dark Archer, in which his birth name is revealed to be Arthur King.
 Merlyn appears in the Young Justice tie-in comic, Young Justice: Targets.

Merchandise
 The Arrowverse incarnation of Malcolm Merlyn received two figures, with one as the Dark Archer and an unmasked variant, from DC Collectibles.
 The Arrowverse incarnation of Malcolm Merlyn received a San Diego Comic-Con 2016-exclusive POP! vinyl figure from Funko.
 The Arrowverse incarnation of Malcolm Merlyn received a GameStop-exclusive vinyl figure from Dorbz.

References

External links
 Merlyn at the DC Database
 Malcolm Merlyn at the DC Database
 

DC Comics supervillains
Characters created by Dick Dillin
Characters created by Mike Friedrich
Characters created by Neal Adams
Comics characters introduced in 1971
DC Comics martial artists
DC Comics television characters
Fictional archers
Fictional assassins in comics
Fictional business executives
Fictional characters with slowed ageing
Fictional mass murderers
Fictional ninja
Fictional serial killers
Fictional swordfighters in comics
Fictional torturers
Suicide Squad members
Supervillains with their own comic book titles